The HTC Salsa is an Android smartphone that was announced by HTC in June 2011 at the Mobile World Congress.

The HTC Salsa is designed and dedicated for Facebook and Social Networking as the Facebook button indicates. The Facebook button is for sharing statuses, pictures or videos on Facebook in one touch.

Specification
Processor = 800 MHz processor / MSM7227 Turbo (ARMv6)
Memory = 512 MB ROM (onboard) + microSD slot (up to 32 GB)  / 512 MB RAM 
Display =  diagonal  320x480 px HVGA Capacitive TFT touch-screen
Camera(Primary) = 5 MP color with LED flash 
Camera (Secondary) = VGA
Connectivity = 800/2100 900/2100 MHz on HSDPA/WCDMA, Quad-band GSM/GPRS/EDGE:850/900/1800/1900 MHz, Bluetooth 3.0, Wi-Fi (IEEE 802.11b/g/n), 3.5 mm stereo
Software = Android 2.3.3 (Gingerbread) with HTC Sense.

Features
Android OS, v2.3 (Gingerbread)
Accelerometer, proximity, compass
A-GPS, SMS (threaded view), MMS, Email, Push Email, IM
HTML
Radio Stereo FM radio with RDS
 Facebook dedicated key
 SNS integration
 Google Search, Maps, Gmail
 YouTube, Google Talk, Picasa integration
 MP3/AAC+/WAV/WMA player
 MP4/H.264 player
 Organizer
 Document viewer/editor
 Voice memo
 Predictive text input

See also
 Google Nexus
 Comparison of smartphones
 HTC ChaCha

References

External links

Salsa
Mobile phones introduced in 2011
Android (operating system) devices
Discontinued smartphones